David Cecil Orr was Dean of Derry from 1984 until his retirement in 1997.

Born in September 1933 he was educated at Trinity College, Dublin where he met his Dublin born wife Valerie and ordained in 1958. After a curacy at Drumragh he held incumbencies at Convoy, Maghera and Mountfield before his appointment to the deanery.

He was Succeeded by the Rev’d Dr William W Morton as Dean of St Columb's and Rector of the Parish of Templemore.

References

1933 births
Alumni of Trinity College Dublin
Irish Anglicans
Deans of Derry
Living people